George William Scoones (9 June 1886 – ?) was an English professional football player and manager.

Career 
Scoones was born in Saint Helier, one of the twelve parishes of Jersey, the largest of the Channel Islands in the English Channel. In 1912, he moved to the Brittany region in France and began playing football with Stade Rennais Université Club. Scoones spent a decade at the club amassing over 80 appearances and scoring 20 goals. In 1918, he served for England in World War I. they were defeated by Red Star Olympique.

References 

1886 births
Year of death missing
Jersey footballers
English footballers
English football managers
Stade Rennais F.C. players
Stade Rennais F.C. managers
People from Saint Helier
Association football midfielders
British military personnel of World War I